Belozersky (masculine), Belozerskaya (feminine), or Belozerskoye (neuter) is a Russian-language adjectival noun derived from the names Beloye Ozero or "Beloozero", literally "White Lake", but commonly rendered as Lake Beloye.

The term may refer to:
Belozersky (surname), derived from the Principality of Beloozero in what is now European Russia
Belozersky Canal, of the Volga–Baltic Waterway
Belozersky District, name of several districts in Russia
St. Cyril of White Lake, sometimes transliterated as Cyril Belozersky
St. Therapont of White Lake, sometimes transliterated as Ferapont Belozersky
Belozerskoye, a rural locality (a selo) in Kurgan Oblast, Russia